Morgan Gwyn Morgans (born 20 April 1932) is a Welsh former professional footballer, who made appearances in the English Football League for Wrexham and Southport.

References

1932 births
English Football League players
Blaenau Ffestiniog Amateur F.C. players
Northampton Town F.C. players
Wrexham A.F.C. players
Southport F.C. players
Living people
Association football defenders
Welsh footballers